Ishika Jaiswal (born 28 July 2003) is an American badminton player. She has earned several BWF international titles.

Achievements

BWF International Challenge/Series (2 titles, 2 runners-up)
Women's singles

Women's doubles

Mixed doubles

  BWF International Challenge tournament
  BWF International Series tournament
  BWF Future Series tournament

References

External links 
 

Living people
2003 births
People from Fremont, California
American female badminton players
American sportspeople of Indian descent
21st-century American women